Rawal Jaisal (–1168), was a Bhati Rajput ruler of Jaisalmer who lived during the 12th century and founded the city of Jaisalmer and Jaisalmer state. Sixth in descent from Rawal Deoraj Bhati, he was the eldest son of Rawal Dusaj of Deoraj (Deorawul), which had its capital at Laudrava. When his father appointed Jaisal's younger half-brother Vijayraj Lanjha as his successor, Vijayraj, upon ascending the throne, drove Jaisal out of the kingdom. He was married to daughter of Haibat Khan and named her as 'Somaldevi'.

Founding of Jaisalmer 
While surveying Trikuta hill, a massive triangular rock rising more than 75 metres out of the surrounding sands, as a more secure location for a new capital, Rawal Jaisal met a sage called Eesul, who was staying on the rock. Upon learning that Jaisal was of Yaduvanshi descent, Eesul told him that according to ancient mythology Krishna and Bhima had come to this location for a ceremony, where Krishna had prophesied that a descendant of his Yaduvanshi clan would one day establish a kingdom here. Eesul showed him a spring which Krishna had created and his prophecy carved into a rock. This rock still remains in a well in the Jaisalmer fort. Encouraged by this meeting Jaisal moved his capital to this location and established it in 1156 in the form of a mud fort and named it Jaisalmer after himself.

References

Further reading

Year of death missing
Maharajas of Rajasthan
Jaisalmer
People from Jaisalmer district
Year of birth uncertain
Indian Hindus
Hindu monarchs